Óscar Alvarado Cook (born 7 November 1944) is a Mexican politician from the Institutional Revolutionary Party. From 2000 to 2003 he served as Deputy of the LVIII Legislature of the Mexican Congress representing Chiapas.

References

1944 births
Living people
Politicians from Chiapas
Institutional Revolutionary Party politicians
21st-century Mexican politicians
National Autonomous University of Mexico alumni
Municipal presidents in Chiapas
Members of the Congress of Chiapas
20th-century Mexican politicians
Mexican judges
Mexican prosecutors
Deputies of the LVIII Legislature of Mexico
Members of the Chamber of Deputies (Mexico) for Chiapas